Pedro Di Lascio (1900–1978) was a Paraguayan painter and engraver.

Collections
Works by Peter Di Lascio can be seen at the Museo Julián de la Herrería and the Centro de Artes Visuales of the Museo del Barro, both in Asunción; in the Braniff collection selected by the University of Texas, United States; at the Instituto Ítalo Latinoamericano, Rome; at the Museo de Cultura Hispánica in Madrid; at the Museo de Arte Hispano Americano in Montevideo, Uruguay; and in private collections in the United States, Spain, France, Italy, Argentina, Germany, Brazil and Paraguay.

Sources
 Diccionario Biográfico Forjadores del Parraguay, 1st edition 2000. Distribuidora Quevedo de Ediciones. Buenos Aires, Argentina
 Josefina Pla, Obras Comletas I: Historia Cultural - Arte Actual in el Paraguay (online version: Biblioteca Virtual del Paraguay)

1900 births
1978 deaths
20th-century engravers
Paraguayan engravers
20th-century Paraguayan painters